William Blyth Gerish (1864–1921) was an English antiquarian, biographer and folklorist from Hertfordshire.

References

1864 births
1921 deaths
English biographers
English folklorists